{{Speciesbox
| image = Temnostoma.bombylans.jpg
| image_caption = Temnostoma bombylans
| genus = Temnostoma
| species = bombylans
| display_parents = 3
| authority = (Fabricius, 1805)
| synonyms = *Milesia bombylans (Fabricius, 1805)
Milesia zetterstedtii Fallén, 1816
Temnostoma nitobei Matsumura, 1916
Temnostoma japonicum Hull, 1944
Temnostoma takahasii' Violovich, 1976
}}Temnostoma bombylans'' is a species of hoverfly. Larva of this species feed in decaying wood of deciduous trees.

References

The Ecology of Commanster

Diptera of Europe
Eristalinae
Insects described in 1805
Taxa named by Johan Christian Fabricius